Harington School is a free school sixth form located in Oakham in the English county of Rutland. The school is named after John Harington, 1st Baron Harington of Exton and John Harington, 2nd Baron Harington of Exton, two notable peers in Rutland in the late sixteenth and early seventeenth centuries.

Established in September 2015, Harington School is governed by a trust which is overseen by three secondary schools located in Rutland: Uppingham Community College, Oakham School and Catmose College. Harington School has its own new dedicated building located next to Catmose College.

References

External links
Harington School official website

Free schools in England
Educational institutions established in 2015
2015 establishments in England
Education in Rutland